Ricardo Ángel Sánchez (born October 2, 1967) is an American Christian musician, guitarist, and worship leader, who is a Grammy-nominated GMA Dove Award-winning songwriter. He has released four albums, Unmerited, Oh What a God, It's Not Over, and Grand Symphony.

Early life and background
Sánchez was born, Ricardo Ángel Sánchez, on October 2, 1967, in Scottsdale, Arizona, Arizona, to parents Vicente and Fransica Sanchez, the youngest of six siblings, four brothers and a sister. He grew up in the Catholic Church, where he went to services alone, and was in a mariachi group with his father, when he was five years-old. Sánchez eventually became a non-denominational Protestant, at The Free Chapel in Gainesville, Georgia, just outside Atlanta, Georgia, before relocating to San Antonio, Texas, to join John Hagee's Cornerstone Church.

Music career
His music recording career started in 2005, with the album, Unmerited, that was released on May 24, 2005, by Taseis Music. He released the subsequent two albums, Oh What a God, on May 25, 2011, and, It's Not Over, on August 2, 2011. His fourth album, Grand Symphony, was released on October 2, 2015, his 48th birthday, with Difference Media Group.

Awards and nominations
He won a GMA Dove Award for Contemporary Gospel Recorded Song in 2011, with Israel Houghton, for "The Power of One". He received a Grammy Award nomination at the 52 Grammy Awards, for "Every Prayer", in the category Best Gospel Song.

Personal life
Sánchez is married to Jennette, and they have three sons, Ricardo Jr., Josiah, and Micha, where they reside in the San Antonio, Texas area. His son Josiah suffered a severe spinal injury, while he has since made a recovery.

Discography
Studio albums
Unmerited (May 24, 2005)
Oh What a God (May 25, 2011)
It's Not Over (August 2, 2011)
Grand Symphony (October 2, 2015)

References

External links
 
 New Release Today profile

1967 births
Living people
American performers of Christian music
Musicians from Arizona
Songwriters from Arizona